Marcellus Rayvon Register (born February 7, 1991), known professionally as Babyface Ray, is an American rapper from Detroit, Michigan. He is noted as an important and prominent figure of the Detroit hip hop scene.

Early life 
Ray recalls participating in sports such as basketball and football.

Career 

In 2010, Ray joined Team Eastside alongside fellow Detroit rapper Peezy. In 2015, he started gaining traction with the release of his debut mixtape MIA Season. In 2017, he released his mixtape Ghetto Wave. In 2019, he released his second mixtape MIA Season 2 the sequel to MIA Season. In February 2021, he released his first EP Unfuckwitable with appearances from EST Gee, Moneybagg Yo and Kash Doll. The EP debuted at number 128 on the Billboard 200 dated February 27, 2021. In August 2021, he released his single "It Ain't My Fault" featuring rapper Big Sean. In January 2022, Ray released his debut album Face with appearances from Swedish rapper Yung Lean, G Herbo, 42 Dugg, Pusha T, Wiz Khalifa, and Landstrip Chip. The album peaked at number 31 on the Billboard 200 and two on Independent Albums chart. Later in 2022, he appeared in the 2022 XXL Freshman class and in the subsequent cypher alongside rappers BabyTron, Cochise and Kali.

Discography 
Studio albums
 Face (2022)
 Mob (2022) – No. 54 US Billboard 200

Mixtapes
 MIA Season (2015)
 Ghetto Wave (2017)
 MIA Season 2 (2019)

EPs
 Unfuckwitable (2021)

References

External links 
 

Living people
21st-century American rappers
21st-century American male musicians
1991 births
African-American male rappers
African-American male songwriters
Gangsta rappers
Midwest hip hop musicians
Rappers from Detroit
Songwriters from Michigan
Trap musicians